Mateusz Kowalczyk and Andreas Mies were the defending champions but chose not to defend their title.

Tomislav Brkić and Ante Pavić won the title after defeating Nikola Čačić and Luca Margaroli 6–3, 4–6, [16–14] in the final.

Seeds

Draw

References
 Main Draw

Poprad-Tatry ATP Challenger Tour - Doubles
2018 Doubles